Snowboarďáci  is a Czech comedy film directed by Karel Janák. It was released in 2004.

Cast and characters
 Vojtěch Kotek as Rendy
 Jiří Mádl as Jáchym
 Ester Geislerová as Marta
 Barbora Seidlová as Tereza
 Lucie Vondráčková as Klára
 Martina Klírová as Lucie
 Jiří Langmajer as Milan

References

External links
 

2004 films
2004 comedy films
Czech Lion Awards winners (films)
Czech comedy films
2000s Czech-language films
2000s Czech films
Czech teen films